Perquimans County High School is a public high school located in Hertford, North Carolina.  It is the only high school in Perquimans County. Perquimans County High School's enrollment as of 2010 is 519 students.  The student body is 59% White; 39% Black; 1% Hispanic; and 1% Asian.

In 2004 the school had almost 600 students. The school had built a gymnasium circa 1954. By 2004 it was outdated, so the school was building a new gymnasium facility.

Notable alumni
Catfish Hunter, former Major League Baseball pitcher and member of the National Baseball Hall of Fame

References

Public high schools in North Carolina
Schools in Perquimans County, North Carolina